Magnus Andersson (born 23 April 1958) is a Swedish former footballer who played as a defender.

Career 
Andersson played for Malmö FF in the 1970s and the 1980s. He played in the European Champions Cup final in 1979 against Nottingham Forest F.C. and was a member of the Sweden national football team in the 1978 FIFA World Cup.

References

External links

1958 births
Living people
Swedish footballers
Sweden international footballers
1978 FIFA World Cup players
Allsvenskan players
Malmö FF players
Association football defenders